Keda, Keda Municiṕaliťeťi) is a municipality in Georgia's southwestern autonomous republic of Adjara with a population of 16,700 people (2021).

Historical monuments in the municipality include the medieval Orthodox churches at Makhuntseti, Zesopeli, and Namonastrevi, and the bridges of Tsoniarisi and Dandalo.

Geography 
Keda borders the municipalities of Khelvachauri to the south and west, Kobuleti to the northwest and Shuakhevi to the east. The municipality also has a 17 kilometer long border with Turkey in the south, where the Shavsheti Range forms the natural border. The Meskheti Range forms the municipality's northwestern border with Kobuleti. The river gorge has a Mediterranean subtropical climate. As the elevation increases, the climate becomes humid, with annual rainfall of around 1500mm per year, providing green vegetation.

Administrative divisions
Keda Municipality is administratively divided into 10 communities (თემი, temi) with 63 villages (სოფელი, sopeli). There is one urban-type settlement (დაბა, daba), the municipal centre Keda.

Population
The population of Keda Municipality is 16,700 according to the 2021 estimate, which is a minimal decrease compared to the last census of 2014. The municipal center of Keda has experienced a relatively significant population decline since 2014, dropping from 1,510 to 1,285 residents in 2021. The population density is 36.9 people per square kilometer.

According to the 2014 census, the population of Keda consisted for 62% of Muslim Georgians, followed by Georgians belonging to the Georgian Orthodox Church (31%). There are no significant ethnic minorities.

Politics

The Keda Municipal Assembly (Georgian: ქედის საკრებულო, Keda Sakrebulo) is a representative body in Keda Municipality consisting of 21 members, elected every four years. The last election was held in October 2021. Roland Beridze of the Georgian Dream party was elected mayor.

See also 

 List of municipalities in Georgia (country)

References

Municipalities of Adjara